is a former Japanese football player and is currently manager of FC Kagura Shimane

Club statistics
Updated to 22 February 2014.

References

External links

J. League (#10)

1980 births
Living people
Tokyo University of Agriculture alumni
Association football people from Hiroshima Prefecture
Japanese footballers
J2 League players
Japan Football League players
Gainare Tottori players
Matsue City FC players
Association football midfielders